Events in the year 1976 in the Republic of India.

Incumbents
 President of India – Fakhruddin Ali Ahmed
 Prime Minister of India – Indira Gandhi
 Chief Justice of India – Ajit Nath Ray

Governors
 Andhra Pradesh – 
 until 10 January: S. Obul Reddy 
 10 January-15 June: Mohanlal Sukhadia 
 starting 15 June: Ramchandra Dhondiba Bhandare
 Assam – L. P. Singh 
 Bihar – Ramchandra Dhondiba Bhandare 
 Gujarat – Kambanthodath Kunhan Vishwanatham 
 Haryana – 
 until 26 March: Birendra Narayan Chakraborty 
 27 March-13 August: Ranjit Singh Narula
 starting 13 August: Jaisukh Lal Hathi
 Himachal Pradesh – S. Chakravarti
 Jammu and Kashmir – L. K. Jha 
 Karnataka – Uma Shankar Dikshit 
 Kerala – N. N. Wanchoo 
 Madhya Pradesh – Satya Narayan Sinha 
 Maharashtra – Ali Yavar Jung (until 11 December), vacant thereafter (starting 11 December)
 Manipur – L.P. Singh 
 Meghalaya – L.P. Singh 
 Nagaland – L.P. Singh 
 Odisha – Akbar Ali Khan (until 17 April), Shiva Narayan Shankar (starting 17 April)
 Punjab – Mahendra Mohan Choudhry 
 Rajasthan – Sardar Jogendra Singh
 Sikkim – B. B. Lal 
 Tamil Nadu – Kodardas Kalidas Shah (until 15 June), Mohan Lal Sukhadia (starting 15 June)
 Tripura – L. P. Singh 
 Uttar Pradesh – Akbar Ali Khan 
 West Bengal – Anthony Lancelot Dias

Events
 National income - 918,117 million
 2 March - The Rajan case, a famous case of Police brutality during the Emergency Period. The victim, P. Rajan, a final year Engineering student at Regional Engineering College, Calicut was arrested by police, taken to Kakkayam and allegedly tortured severely which led to his death. It is believed that his body was thrown into the Kakkayam Dam. 
 16 April – A family planning initiative involves the vasectomy of thousands of men and tubal ligation of women, either for payment or under coercive conditions. (The minimum age for marriage is also raised to 21 years for men and 18 years for women.) The son of then-Prime Minister Indira Gandhi, Sanjay Gandhi, is largely blamed for what turned out to be a failed program. A strong backlash against any initiative associated with family planning followed the highly controversial program, which continues (in part) into the 21st century.
 10 June – George Fernandes arrested from Calcutta during the Emergency.
 15 November – Subramanian Swamy was expelled from Rajya Sabha for his campaign against the Emergency in foreign countries.

Law

Births

January to June
 5 February – Abhishek Bachchan, actor.
 4 April – Simran Bagga, actress.
 9 April – Rohit Gupta, writer and inventor.
 9 April – Nithin Sathya, actor.
 21 May – Aditi Gowitrikar, model, actress and physician.
 9 June – Amisha Patel, actress.
5 June  Rambha, actress.
7 June  Pandiraj, film director.
29 June – Saurabh Kalia, Military officer-KARGIL HERO. (d. 1998).

July to December
 20 July – Debashish Mohanty, cricketer. 
12 August – Baljit Singh Saini, field hockey player.
16 September  Meena, actress.
 19 September – Ishaa Koppikar, actress and model.
 27 October  Pooja Batra, actress.
29 October  Raghava Lawrence, actor, choreographer, director.
14 November – Hemang Badani, cricketer.
15 December – Baichung Bhutia, soccer player.

Deaths
 25 January – Swami Anand, Gandhi activist and writer (b. 1887)
 2 March - P. Rajan, college student and victim of Police brutality (b. 1954)
 28 July – T. Nagi Reddy, communist politician (b. 1917).
 27 August – Mukesh, playback singer (b. 1923).
 2 September – Vishnu Sakharam Khandekar, writer (b. 1898).

References

See also 
 List of Bollywood films of 1976

 
India
Years of the 20th century in India